Marzdaran may refer to:

Marzdaran District, Iran
Marzdaran Rural District, Iran
Mazdavand, Iran

See also
Mazdaran